Talkin' Stick is an album by American jazz saxophonist Oliver Lake, which was recorded in 1997 and released on Lake's own Passin' Thru label. It features a quintet with vibraphonist Jay Hoggard, pianist Geri Allen, bassist Belden Bullock and drummer Cecil Brooks III, playing six Lake's originals, Julius Hemphill's composition "Hard Blues", and the piece "Only If You Live There" by Curtis Clark.

Reception

In his review for AllMusic, David Dupont states: "Talkin' Stick puts the versatile Oliver Lake into what could pass for a conventional hard bop quintet. However, with Lake's full-throated alto as the primary voice, there's little that's business-as-usual about this date."

The Penguin Guide to Jazz wrote: "The partnership of alto and vibes will inevitably make some listeners think of Dolphy's Out to Lunch!, and the connection is definitely there. Fortunately, the material is so strong and the group so well suited to the project that the results are high quality."

Track listing
All compositions by Oliver Lake except as indicated
 "Talkin' Stick" – 7:17
 "Hard Blues" (Julius Hemphill) – 8:50
 "Reminds Me" – 7:22
 "Massai Moves" – 12:15
 "Only If You Live There" (Curtis Clark) – 6:57
 "Shifts" – 8:54
 "Song for Jay" – 9:07
 "Philly Blues" – 12:41

Personnel
Oliver Lake - alto saxophone
Jay Hoggard – vibraphone 
Geri Allen - piano 
Belden Bullock – bass 
Cecil Brooks III - drums

References

2000 albums
Oliver Lake albums